Angika (also known as Anga, Angikar or Chhika-Chhiki) is an Eastern Indo-Aryan language spoken in some parts of the Indian states of Bihar and Jharkhand, as well as in parts of Nepal.

Angika Language is closely related to languages such as Maithili, Bengali, Bhojpuri and Magahi. Historically it was written in a separate script known as 'Anga Lipi'. Later writers shifted to Kaithi Script and eventually to Devanagari Script.

Territory 
Angika is mainly spoken in south-eastern Bihar, including Munger, Bhagalpur and Banka districts; and the Santhal Pargana division of Jharkhand. Its speakers number around 15 million people.
Apart from Bihar and Jharkhand states of India, it is also spoken in the Morang district of Nepalese Terai as a minority language. 1.9% people of Morang returned Angika as their mother tongue during the 2011 Nepal census.

Relationship to Maithili 
Angika was classified as a dialect of Maithili by George Abraham Grierson in the Linguistic Survey of India (1903). However, the Angika speakers now assert its status as an independent language. When the proponents of the Maithili language in Bihar demanded use of Maithili-medium primary education in the early 20th century, the people of the Angika-speaking region did not support them, and instead favoured Hindi-medium education. In the 1960s and the 1970s, when the Maithili speakers demanded a separate Mithila state, the Angika and Bajjika speakers made counter-demands for recognition of their languages.

Maithili proponents believe that the Government of Bihar and the pro-Hindi Bihar Rashtrabhasha Parishad promoted Angika and Bajjika as distinct languages to weaken the Maithili language movement; many of them still consider Angika to be a dialect of Maithili. People from mainly Maithil Brahmins and Karan Kayasthas castes have supported the Maithili movement, while people from various other castes in the Mithila region have projected Angika and Bajjika as their mother tongues, attempting to break away from the Maithili-based regional identity.

Official status 
Angika is not listed in the 8th schedule of the constitution of India.

Angika has the status of "second state language" in the Indian state of Jharkhand since 2018. It shares this status with 15 other languages, including Maithili.

See also
Anga Lipi
Anga

References

Bibliography 

 
  pp. 13, 95.
 
 
 
 
 

Languages written in Devanagari
Languages of India
Languages of Nepal
Eastern Indo-Aryan languages
Bihari languages
Languages of Bihar
Languages of Jharkhand